Holy Trinity Church, Besthorpe is a Grade II listed parish church in the Church of England in Besthorpe, Nottinghamshire.

History

The church was built in 1844 as a chapel of ease to St Helena's Church, South Scarle.

It is part of a group of parishes which includes:
St Bartholomew's Church, Langford
St Giles' Church, Holme
St Cecilia's Church, Girton
All Saints' Church, Harby
St George the Martyr's Church, North & South Clifton
All Saints' Church, Collingham
St John the Baptist's Church, Collingham
St Helena's Church, South Scarle
St Helen's Church, Thorney
All Saints' Church, Winthorpe

See also
Listed buildings in Besthorpe, Nottinghamshire

References

Church of England church buildings in Nottinghamshire
Besthorpe